Chemical Valley may refer to:
 The chemical industry in Kanawha Valley, West Virginia, US
 The chemical industry in Sarnia, Ontario, Canada; see Environmental impact of the chemical industry in Sarnia